Christopher Nigel Beard (10 October 1936 – 31 July 2017) was a British Labour politician who served as Member of Parliament (MP) for Bexleyheath and Crayford in London from 1997 to 2005.

He previously contested several parliamentary constituencies: Woking at the 1979 general election, Portsmouth North at the 1983 general election and Erith and Crayford at the 1992 general election. At the 1997 general election, he was returned as MP for Bexleyheath and Crayford. Before this, he had been senior research manager for ICI and Zeneca. He retained the seat at the 2001 election but lost it in the 2005 election to David Evennett of the Conservative Party.

Beard was a loyal follower of the Labour whip, voting for the Iraq War and other government policies. He also introduced a Private Member's Bill to fix British Summer Time as standard time all year round. He died at the age of 80 in July 2017 after a long illness.

References

External links

1936 births
2017 deaths
Labour Party (UK) MPs for English constituencies
UK MPs 1997–2001
UK MPs 2001–2005
People educated at Castleford Academy
Place of birth missing
Place of death missing